Langilangi Haupeakui (born 3 July 1989) is a United States international rugby union player who currently plays for the LA Giltinis of Major League Rugby (MLR). His regular playing position is either No. 8 or Flanker.

Amateur career

Haupeakui was born in San Mateo, California and played American football before playing rugby union at college. He played with Folau Niua at East Palo Alto Razorbacks.

When not on Warriors duty, Haupeakui turned out for Stirling County.

Professional career

He was picked up by Sacramento Express for the inaugural PRO Rugby league in the United States.

It was announced on 28 September 2016 that Haupeakui signed for Glasgow Warriors on a two-year deal, subject to visa and medical. He made his competitive debut for Glasgow on 28 October 2016 against Benetton Treviso at Scotstoun Stadium. Brian Alainu'uese also made his Warriors debut in the same match - Alain'uese replaced Tim Swinson on 51 minutes; and Haupeakui replaced Simone Favaro on 55 minutes. This gives Alainueuse a Glasgow Warrior No. 272 and Haupeakui a Glasgow Warrior No. 273.

On 25 January 2017 it was announced that Haupeakui was released from Glasgow Warriors to return home to the USA for family reasons.

International career

He was called up to the USA team in the summer of 2016.

California Rugby League
In 2019 he played rugby league for the San Francisco Savage vs Los Angeles Mongrel.

References

External links
USA Profile

Living people
1989 births
American people of Tongan descent
Rugby union flankers
Rugby union number eights
Glasgow Warriors players
American rugby league players
American expatriate rugby union players
American expatriate sportspeople in Scotland
Expatriate rugby union players in Scotland
Sacramento Express players
People from San Mateo, California
Stirling County RFC players
United States international rugby union players
LA Giltinis players